Penha–Lojas Besni is a station on Line 3 (Red) of the São Paulo Metro. The station was renamed after the purchase of the naming right by the shoes and sneakers store network Lojas Besni.

SPTrans Lines
The following SPTrans bus lines can be accessed. Passengers may use a Bilhete Único card for transfer:

References

São Paulo Metro stations
Railway stations opened in 1986
1986 establishments in Brazil